For the city in California, see Hollywood.

Hollywood is an unincorporated community in Appomattox County, Virginia, United States.

References
GNIS reference

Unincorporated communities in Virginia
Unincorporated communities in Appomattox County, Virginia

 Hollywood is also the name of a city in california.